The Scott Morrison Award of Hockey Excellence was an annual award given to the most outstanding junior hockey player born in the province of Saskatchewan.  It was given out from the years 1945-1961, excluding 1956.

History 
The award was named after Scott Morrison, an up-and-coming junior player who was killed in a freak ice resurfacer accident on February 21, 1943.
In September of the following year, the decision was made to create an annual award in Morrison's memory

Winners

References

General
 

Specific

Canadian ice hockey trophies and awards
Ice hockey in Saskatchewan
Saskatchewan awards